Andrea Modica (born 1960) is an American photographer and professor of photography at Drexel University. She is known for portrait photography and for her use of platinum printing, created using an 8"x10" large format camera. Modica is the author of many monographs, including Treadwell (1996) and Barbara (2002).

Early life and education
Modica was born in Brooklyn, New York. She earned her BFA in Visual Arts and Art History from State University of New York College (SUNY) at Purchase, Purchase, NY in 1982, and earned her MFA in Photography from Yale University in 1985.

Teaching
Modica taught photography at the State University of New York – Oneonta for thirteen years, and has also taught at Princeton University, Parsons School of Design, the State University of New York College at Purchase, and Colorado College. She is currently a professor of photography at Drexel University.

Work

Modica's most known work is Treadwell. From 1986 to 2001, she staged and photographed a young girl named Barbara and her family in upstate New York with an 8x10 view camera, following the family from farmhouse to farmhouse in the town of Treadwell. Chronicle Books published the work in book form in 1996. She continued to photograph Barbara until her death in 2001 from childhood diabetes. The work from the later period of Barbara's life was published by Nazraeli Press in 2004.

As We Wait is a collection of previously unpublished portraits, still lifes, landscapes, and horses curated by Larry Fink.

Even before starting the series Best Friends, Modica had been photographing students at a high school in Connecticut, and she noticed that a friend was often present in the background of the photoshoots. She started photographing friends together in other high schools in Philadelphia and Modena, Italy.

For Fountain, Modica documented the Baker Family in Fountain, Colorado for nine years. The family runs a small slaughterhouse. She photographs the inner workings of the farm and the intimate family moments.

Real Indians combines first-person narratives by 37 Native American people with black and white photographic portraits of each person by Modica.

For Minor League, Modica visited the New York Yankees' spring-training camp in Florida for a project on young ballplayers in 1993. She photographed the young athletes' anxieties, focusing on the minor league players who were hoping to go up.

Collections
Modica's work is held in the following permanent collections:
Museum of Modern Art: 1 print (as of 1 July 2022)
Metropolitan Museum of Art: 12 prints (as of 1 July 2022)
Whitney Museum of American Art: 3 prints (as of 1 July 2022)
Smithsonian American Art Museum, Washington, D.C.: 5 prints (as of 1 July 2022)
San Francisco Museum of Modern Art: 4 prints (as of 1 July 2022)

Awards
1990: Fulbright-Hays Research Grant
1993: Guggenheim Arts Fellowship from the John Simon Guggenheim Memorial Foundation

Publications
 Minor League. Photographers at Work Series. Washington D.C.: Smithsonian. 1993. .
 Treadwell. San Francisco: Chronicle. 1996. . With an introduction by Maria Morris Hambourg and an essay by Annie Proulx.
 Human Being. Portland: Nazraeli. 2001. . With a foreword by Modica and "Anthropological Descriptions" by J. Michael Hoffman.
 Andrea Modica: At The Edge Of Fiction. Light Work. 2001. .
Barbara. Portland: Nazraeli, 2002. . With a foreword by Modica. 2002
 Real Indians. New York: Melcher. 2003. . With an introduction by Sherman Alexie.
Fountain. Lunenburg, VT: Stinehour, 2008. With an afterword by Modica.
 L'Amico del Cuore. Portland: Nazraeli, 2014. .
 As We Wait. Italy: Grafiche dell'Artiere. 2015. . With an introduction by Larry Fink.

References

External links
 AndreaModica.com

Further reading 

Drexel University faculty
Yale University alumni
Photographers from New York City
Artists from Brooklyn
Living people
1960 births
American women photographers
American women academics
21st-century American women